The Wandong Country Music Festival was an annual country music festival held in Wandong, Victoria,  north of the state capital, Melbourne. The earlier incarnation started in 1972, which was one of Australia's two largest country music festivals. In 1979 the festival's committee issued a 2× LP record by various artists, Wandong Country: the First Live Souvenir Recording of Australia's Top Country Artists, via the R.I.M.S. record label, Melbourne. Dwindling crowds in the early 1980s led to the festival's cessation.

In 2001 the 21st century version was inaugurated. The 2006 festival was held in early March at the LB Lavern Reserve in Dry Creek Crescent. As of 2012, the festival was no longer running, "due to circumstances beyond our control", according to the committee's website.

See also

List of country music festivals
List of folk festivals
Country music

References

External links
  archived from the original on 22 July 2012. Accessed on 23 December 2017.

Folk festivals in Australia
Music festivals established in 1972
Festivals in Victoria (Australia)
Country music festivals in Australia